Bruno Cipolla  (born 24 December 1952) is a retired Italian rowing coxswain who had his best achievements in the coxed pairs, together with Renzo Sambo and Primo Baran. They won a European title in 1967 and an Olympic gold medal in 1968, for which Cipolla received a car from the Fiat company. His career was interrupted for six months by a motorcycle accident after the Olympics. He retired in 1971.

References

External links

 

1952 births
People from Cuneo
Living people
Italian male rowers
Olympic rowers of Italy
Olympic gold medalists for Italy
Rowers at the 1968 Summer Olympics
Olympic medalists in rowing
Medalists at the 1968 Summer Olympics
Coxswains (rowing)
European Rowing Championships medalists
Sportspeople from the Province of Cuneo